Frankie Annette Reed (born 1954, Baltimore) is an American diplomat. She is currently the United States Consul-General in Melbourne. From 2011-2015 she was the United States Ambassador to Fiji, Kiribati, Nauru, Tonga, and Tuvalu. She has a BA in journalism from Howard University and a doctorate in law from the University of California, Berkeley.

Before her appointment as ambassador, Reed was a deputy assistant secretary in the Bureau of East Asian and Pacific Affairs, responsible for relations with Australia, New Zealand and the Pacific Islands. She was previously a lecturer and diplomat-in-residence at the University of California at Berkeley.

Career
Reed was deputy chief of mission in Apia, Samoa, from 1999 to 2002, and then in Conakry, Guinea from 2003 to 2005. From 2005 to 2008 she was consul general and deputy U.S. observer to the Council of Europe and the European Court of Human Rights in Strasbourg, France.

She has also been deputy director in the Office of Australia, New Zealand and Pacific Island Affairs, political section chief in Dakar, Senegal and a political officer in Nairobi, Kenya and in Yaounde, Cameroon.Frankie A. Reed arrived in Melbourne in March 2015 to assume the position of Consul General at the U.S. Consulate General Melbourne.

References

External links

Ambassador Frankie A. Reed biography, Embassy of the United States

1954 births
Living people
Ambassadors of the United States to Fiji
Ambassadors of the United States to Kiribati
Ambassadors of the United States to Nauru
Ambassadors of the United States to Tonga
Ambassadors of the United States to Tuvalu
African-American diplomats
Howard University alumni
UC Berkeley School of Law alumni
American women ambassadors
American consuls
United States Foreign Service personnel
21st-century African-American people
21st-century African-American women
21st-century American diplomats
20th-century African-American people
20th-century African-American women